Nakifuma is a town in the Central Region of Uganda.

Location
Nakifuma lies in Nakifuma sub-county, Kyaggwe County, in Mukono District. The town is located on the main highway from Kampala, through Gayaza, Kalagi and on to Kayunga. The road leading in and out of Nakifuma is an all-weather tarmac highway. The coordinates of Nakifuma are:0°32'27.0"N, 32°47'24.0"E (Latitude:0.5408; Longitude:32.7900).

Overview
Nakifuma is the location of the headquarters of Nakifuma sub-county, one of the two sub-counties in Mukono District. The other sub-county in  the district is Mukono sub-county, where the town of Mukono is located. Nakifuma Central market is the largest fresh-food market in the town.

Population
The exact population of Nakifuma s not known as of May 2011.

Points of interest
The following points of interest lie within town or close to its borders:

 The offices of Nakifuma Town Council
 The offices of Nakifuma County, one of the constituent counties of Mukono District.
 Nakifuma Central Market
 Nakifuma Police Station
 The Kalagi-Kayunga Road - The all-weather, tarmac road passes through Nakifuma in a Northeast to Southwest direction.

See also

References

External links
 He Was Inspired By Farmers He Taught

Populated places in Central Region, Uganda
Cities in the Great Rift Valley
Mukono District